The Half guilder coin was a silver coin struck in the Kingdom of the Netherlands between 1818 and 1930. The obverse featured a portrait of the Dutch reigning King or Queen. On the reverse was a crowned Dutch coat of arms between the value. All coins were minted in Utrecht except the year 1829 and 1830 that were minted in Brussels.

Dimensions and weight

Versions

References

External links
Obverses and reverses

Guilder
Coins of the Netherlands
Fifty-cent coins